Toshiyuki Tsuru (都留 稔幸) is an anime director known for his work on the feature film Naruto the Movie 3: The Animal Riot of Crescent Moon Island.
He also directed the anime series Gungrave.

Filmography

References

External links
 

Living people
Japanese film directors
Year of birth missing (living people)